Michio Kitazume (北爪 道夫 Kitazume Michio, born February 12, 1948, in Tokyo, Japan) is a Japanese composer and conductor.

Biography
Michio Kitazume was born in Tokyo. He studied at Tokyo University of the Arts.

Works

Orchestral
 Ei-sho (1993), The 42nd Otaka Prize, '95 International Rostrum of Composers Grand Prix
 From the beginning of the sea (1999)
 Scene of the earth (2000), The 49th Otaka Prize
 Song is always there

Concerto
 Side by side for perc solo and orchestra (1987)
 Clarinet concerto (2002)
 Concerto for orchestra (2003)
 Cello Concerto

Chamber music
 Oasis for flute, violin and piano (1972)
 Slapping Crossing for bass clarinet and percussion (1976)
 Stream III for percussion ensemble (2007)

Solo
 Shadows IIIa for percussion (1976)
 Shadows IIIb for percussion (1977)
 Shadows IV for clarinet (1977)
 Side by side (percussion solo version) (1977)
 Renga for clarinet (1996)
 Blue Cosmic Garden I (1984), II (2006) for guitar

Piano music
 Distances for piano (2006)
 Secret Folk Song for piano (2006)

Wind orchestral
 Festa (1991)
 Secret Song (2004)
 Fanfare in the Forest (2005)
 Stream II (2007)
 Narabi yuku tomo (2008)
 Kumo no ue no sanpomichi (2009)
 Metamorphosis of Clouds (2009)

Mandolin orchestral
 Canto (1997)
 Blue Cosmic Garden III

Choral music
 "Saru" suit (1983)
 The Sea (1999)
 Kaita's Garance (2001)
 Mawaru-Uta (2003)
 Odeon (2004)
 Kotoba-Asobi-Uta-Mata (2004)
 Man'you-no-uta
 Words Play Songs (2001)

Tape music
 Reincarnation (1982)

External links
Official site

1948 births
20th-century classical composers
20th-century Japanese composers
20th-century Japanese male musicians
21st-century classical composers
21st-century Japanese composers
21st-century Japanese male musicians
Japanese classical composers
Japanese male classical composers
Living people
Musicians from Tokyo